Villeroy may refer to:

Places

Villeroy, Quebec, a municipality in the province of Québec
Villeroy, Seine-et-Marne, a commune in the French region of Île-de-France
Villeroy, Somme, a commune in the French region of Picardie
Villeroy, Yonne, a commune in the French region of Bourgogne
Villeroy-sur-Méholle, a commune in the French region of Lorraine

People

Nicolas de Neufville, seigneur de Villeroy (1543-1617), a secretary of state under Henry III of France and Henry IV of France
Nicolas de Neufville de Villeroy (1598-1685), a French nobleman and governor of Louis XIV
François de Neufville, duc de Villeroi (1644-1730), a French military leader

Historic buildings
Hôtel de Villeroy, home of the Villeroy family from 1370 to 1671, still existing and located in Paris near the Louvre.

Other

Villeroy & Boch, a manufacturer of ceramics